Jacques Ayé Abehi (born 1942) is an Ivorian former javelin thrower who competed in the 1972 Summer Olympics and in the 1976 Summer Olympics. He was the gold medallist at the 1973 All-Africa Games and the 1979 African Championships in Athletics.

References

External links
 

1942 births
Living people
Ivorian javelin throwers
Male javelin throwers
Olympic athletes of Ivory Coast
Athletes (track and field) at the 1972 Summer Olympics
Athletes (track and field) at the 1976 Summer Olympics
Place of birth missing (living people)
Ivorian male athletes
African Games gold medalists for Ivory Coast
African Games medalists in athletics (track and field)
Athletes (track and field) at the 1973 All-Africa Games